Club 3 de Febrero is a Paraguayan football (soccer) club from the neighbourhood of Barrio Ricardo Brugada, in Asunción. The club was founded on 10 March 1919 and plays in the Third Division (metropolitan). Their home games are played at the Estadio 3 de Febrero.

The club has been playing in the lower divisions of the Paraguayan league for several decades.

History
In 1972 the club won their first championship (the Third Division) and promoted to Second Division.

The "3 de Febrero" fell three times to Fourth Division, but also rose three times from the same, as runner-up 2001 and as champion (2007, 2010).

Honours
Paraguayan Third Division: 1
1972

Paraguayan Fourth Division: 2
2007, 2010
Runner-up (1): 2001

References

External links
 Albigol: 3 de Febrero Info

Football clubs in Paraguay
Football clubs in Asunción
Association football clubs established in 1919
Club 3 de Febrero